is a 1994 racing video game developed and published by Sega for the Game Gear in Japan; the gameplay involves players controlling one of four characters as they race to the finish line, with levels themed after the original Sonic the Hedgehog. The game was created as a rival to Nintendo's Super Mario Kart, which released in 1992.

The game released exclusively in Japan, with a North American release planned, but cancelled due to concerns about its quality; it later saw release as part of Sonic Adventure DX in 2003. Reception to Sonic Drift has been mixed-to-negative, with the general criticism being its similarity to Super Mario Kart, and the low view distance. A sequel, Sonic Drift 2, released in 1995.

Gameplay

Sonic Drift is a racing video game in the vein of games like Super Mario Kart (1992). Players control one of four characters―Sonic the Hedgehog, Miles "Tails" Prower, Amy Rose, and Dr. Robotnik―and race around a series of tracks, with the objective being to cross the finish line in first place. Tracks are divided into three grand prix modes and are themed after levels from the original Sonic the Hedgehog (1991).

Each character has their own attributes that make them weaker in some areas and stronger in others. For instance, Sonic has fast acceleration but poor control, while Robotnik has poor acceleration but moves at high speed. Driving into television monitors scattered around the track awards the player a power-up, such as a temporary speed boost or invincibility.

Tracks also contain gold rings that can be collected to use a special attack, which is unique for each character. Alongside a traditional racing mode, the game also features a training mode and multiplayer options that are compatible with the Game Gear's link cable peripheral.

Development and release

Sonic Drift was developed by Sega AM2, a development studio for Sega headed by Yu Suzuki, who directed critically and commercially successful games for Sega, such as Hang-On, Space Harrier, Out Run, and Virtua Fighter, and released in Japan for the Game Gear on March 18, 1994. A Western release was planned but canceled due to Sega of America CEO Tom Kalinske’s concerns regarding its quality. In place of Drift's release in America, Sega instead released a port of Sonic Spinball. Drift is the first racing game in the Sonic the Hedgehog franchise, and was created specifically to rival the success of Nintendo's Super Mario Kart (1992). Early versions of the game featured Flicky, a blue bird that has made frequent appearances throughout the series, as a playable character, who was subsequently replaced by Amy Rose in the final version. The music that plays when collecting a blue invincibility power-up is a sped-up version of the opening song You Can Do Anything from Sonic CD. Drift is also the first Sonic game to feature Amy and Dr. Robotnik as playable characters. The soundtrack was composed by Naofumi Hataya.

In 2003, Sonic Drift was ported to the GameCube as an unlockable extra in Sonic Adventure DX: Director's Cut, though it was omitted from the Xbox 360 and PlayStation 3 releases. It was compiled into Sonic Mega Collection Plus for the Xbox, PlayStation 2 and PC in 2005, and was digitally re-released for the now-defunct GameTap storefront in 2006. A demo of Drift is also included in Sonic Gems Collection.

Reception

Sonic Drift received mainly mixed reviews from the press. Japanese publication Famitsu heavily compared the game to Super Mario Kart, feeling that the game was largely uninspired and generally lacking in content compared to Nintendo's game. They were also critical of the game's short horizon, which they claimed made it hard to see what was ahead of the player. Electronic Gaming Monthly was more positive towards it in a preview, saying that the game was fast-paced and enjoyable but the flashing, choppy scrolling hampered the gameplay somewhat. They enjoyed the game's amount of modes, namely the Vs. Mode. Jeuxvideo.com in 2012 also compared the game to Super Mario Kart, disliking Drift for being too simplistic and for being very easy to finish, alongside the general lack of content and poor presentation. They stated: "Too simple and too fast to finish, Sonic Drift is unfortunately not a title that will fascinate the crowds." Its inclusion in Sonic Mega Collection was negatively received; GameSpy passingly labeled it as "almost unplayable", while Eurogamer mockingly called it "a terrible, terrible racing game whose flickering madness actually made me physically sick."

Retrospectively in 2019, Hardcore Gaming 101 said that the gameplay itself was decent and solid, but felt that it was greatly lacking in content and variety. They criticized the track design in particular for being generally boring, lacking in presentation, and for the stage themes being purely cosmetic instead of affecting the track designs themselves. Hardcore Gaming 101 argued that the "controversial" short horizon was easy to become used to, and said that it didn't have that negative of an effect on the game itself. They concluded their review with: "Sonic Drift is a decent enough racer, but the lack of variety in track design (both visually and thematically) and the small amount of content mean that it’s a racer only a small number of people will dedicate themselves to."

Notes

References

1994 video games
Sega video games
Game Gear games
Game Gear-only games
Kart racing video games
Racing video games
Japan-exclusive video games
Single-player video games
Sonic the Hedgehog spin-off games
Video games developed in Japan